Over a thousand characters from the Latin script are encoded in the Unicode Standard, grouped in several basic and extended Latin blocks. The extended ranges contain mainly precomposed letters plus diacritics that are equivalently encoded with combining diacritics, as well as some ligatures and distinct letters, used for example in the orthographies of various African languages (including click symbols in Latin Extended-B) and the Vietnamese alphabet (Latin Extended Additional). Latin Extended-C contains additions for Uighur and the Claudian letters. Latin Extended-D comprises characters that are mostly of interest to medievalists.  Latin Extended-E mostly comprises characters used for German dialectology (Teuthonista). Latin Extended-F and -G contain characters for phonetic transcription.

Blocks
As of version 15.0 of the Unicode Standard, 1,481 characters in the following 19 blocks are classified as belonging to the Latin script.

Basic Latin, 0000–007F. This block corresponds to ASCII.
Latin-1 Supplement, 0080–00FF
Latin Extended-A, 0100–017F
Latin Extended-B, 0180–024F
IPA Extensions, 0250–02AF
Spacing Modifier Letters, 02B0–02FF
Phonetic Extensions, 1D00–1D7F
Phonetic Extensions Supplement, 1D80–1DBF
Latin Extended Additional, 1E00–1EFF
Superscripts and Subscripts, 2070–209F
Letterlike Symbols, 2100–214F
Number Forms, 2150–218F
Latin Extended-C, 2C60–2C7F
Latin Extended-D, A720–A7FF
Latin Extended-E, AB30–AB6F
Alphabetic Presentation Forms (Latin ligatures) FB00–FB4F
Halfwidth and Fullwidth Forms, FF00–FFEF
Latin Extended-F, 10780–107BF
Latin Extended-G, 1DF00–1DFFF

In addition, a number of Latin-like characters are encoded in the Currency Symbols, Control Pictures, CJK Compatibility, Enclosed Alphanumerics, Enclosed CJK Letters and Months, Mathematical Alphanumeric Symbols, and Enclosed Alphanumeric Supplement blocks, but, although they are Latin letters graphically, they have the script property common, and, so, do not belong to the Latin script in Unicode terms. Lisu also consists almost entirely of Latin forms, but uses its own script property.

Table of characters
In this table those characters with the Unicode script property of Latin are highlighted in colour, indicating the version of Unicode they were introduced in.  Reserved code points (which may be assigned as characters at a future date) have a grey background.  All characters that do not belong to the Latin script have a white background (and the version of Unicode they were introduced in is therefore not indicated).

See also
Universal Character Set characters
Letterlike Symbols (Unicode block)
List of Latin-script letters
List of Latin letters by shape
Mathematical Alphanumeric Symbols
European Latin Unicode subset (DIN 91379)

References 

Unicode